Feralisaurus is an extinct genus of neodiapsid reptile, possibly a basal lepidosauromorph, known from the Middle Triassic of south-western England. It contains one species, Feralisaurus corami, which was described by Cavicchini et al. in 2020. It was found in the Helsby Sandstone Formation.

Discovery
The holotype and only known specimen of Feralisaurus, BRSUG 29950-12, was discovered in 2014 near Sidmouth, Devon.

Classification
Feralisaurus was recovered as either a basal neodiapsid or as a basal lepidosauromorph, with the researchers preferring a placement within Lepidosauromorpha.

References

Mesozoic lepidosauromorphs
Fossils of England
Triassic England
Middle Triassic reptiles of Europe
Fossil taxa described in 2020
Prehistoric reptile genera